Appraisal may refer to:

Decision-making
 Appraisal (decision analysis), a decision method
 Archival appraisal, process for determining which records need to be kept, and for how long
 Project appraisal, comparing options to deliver an objective
 Economic appraisal, an appraisal based on comparison of monetary equivalents

Property valuation 
 Real estate appraisal, the practice of determining the value of real property
 Business valuation, the process of determining the value of businesses
 Art valuation, the process of determining the value of works of art
 Domain appraisal, the act of evaluating the worth of a specific domain name
 Archival appraisal, the appraisal of archival collections in libraries
 Appraisal value, the value of a company based on a projection of future cash flow

Other uses 
 Appraisal (discourse analysis), the ways that writers or speakers express approval or disapproval for things or ideas
 Appraisal theory, a psychological theory of emotion and cognition
 Appraisal Institute, an international association of professional real estate appraisers
 Performance appraisal, a method to evaluate employee performance

See also 
 Appraiser
 Evaluation (disambiguation)